Villesèque (Languedocien: Vilaseca) is a commune in the Lot department in south-western France.

Geography
The Barguelonnette rises in the commune, then flows southwestward through its southern part.

See also
Communes of the Lot department

References

Communes of Lot (department)